TASIS Schools, formally established as the TASIS Foundation, is a private Swiss foundation which operates a group of four international schools (including both day and boarding schools), operating in Switzerland, England, Portugal, and Puerto Rico. Its history dates to 1956, with the founding of its first school, in Switzerland (the oldest American boarding school in Europe).

TASIS schools are known as some of the most expensive and highly ranked boarding schools in the world.

History

The group originated with the foundation of its first boarding school, TASIS Switzerland, in Lugano, Switzerland, in 1956.

TASIS England was founded in 1976, in Thorpe, Surrey, outside of London.

TASIS Hellenic was founded in 1979 in Athens, Greece, as a successor to the Hellenic International School. The main campus was in Kefalari, with the elementary school initially in Ekali.  Until the mid-80s, TASIS Hellenic also operated a boarding unit. TASIS Hellenic was sold to the International School of Athens in the early 2000's.

TASIS Dorado was founded in Puerto Rico in 2002.

TASIS Portugal was founded in 2020, in Linhó, Sintra on the Portuguese Riviera, outside Lisbon.

Schools

 TASIS Switzerland in Montagnola, Collina d'Oro, outside of Lugano
 TASIS England, in Thorpe, Surrey, outside of London
 TASIS Portugal, in Linhó, Sintra, outside of Lisbon
 TASIS Dorado, in Dorado, Puerto Rico, outside of San Juan

References

External links

 TASIS Schools official website

TASIS
International school associations